The Throckmorton County Courthouse and Jail, in Throckmorton, Texas, was listed on the National Register of Historic Places in 1978. It is also a State Antiquities Landmark and a Recorded Texas Historic Landmark.

History 
The courthouse was designed by architects Martin, Byrnes & Johnston and was built in 1890, when the county had only 124 residents. The laying of the cornerstone took place on August 30, 1890. The jail was built in 1893 by Pauly Jail Building & Manufacturing of St. Louis.

In 1938, the building was substantially altered. A restoration was started in 2010 and completed in 2015. On this occasion, a large part of the 1930s modifications were undone to restore the original structure: KBL Restoration (a company from Hallsville) carried out extensive work on the building, including the reconstruction of the wooden cupola and the roof as well as the restoration of the doors and windows. Some modern amenities were also added for accessibility. The restored courthouse was rededicated on March 12, 2015.

Structure 
The courthouse is a two-story building with walls of light brown and grey sandstone.

See also

National Register of Historic Places listings in Throckmorton County, Texas
Recorded Texas Historic Landmarks in Throckmorton County
List of county courthouses in Texas

References

Courthouses in Texas
Courthouses on the National Register of Historic Places in Texas
Jails in Texas
National Register of Historic Places in Texas
Government buildings completed in 1890
Throckmorton County, Texas